Heath milkwort is a common name for several plants and may refer to the following species:
Comesperma ericinum, from Australia
Polygala serpyllifolia, from Europe